Aída Judith González Castrellón (born December 4, 1962) is a Panamanian writer and medical doctor. She studied medicine at the University of Panama.

Gonzalez has published different stories in the magazine Maga such as Pájaro Sin Alas (Birds Without Wings), Espejismos (Mirages).

Awards and nominations

References 

Living people
1962 births
Panamanian women writers
20th-century women writers
20th-century Panamanian women writers
20th-century Panamanian writers
21st-century Panamanian women writers
21st-century Panamanian writers